Pterolophia guineensis is a species of beetle in the family Cerambycidae. It was described by James Thomson in 1864, originally under the genus Alyattes.

Subspecies
 Pterolophia guineensis ugandicola Breuning, 1963
 Pterolophia guineensis guineensis (Thomson, 1864)

References

guineensis
Beetles described in 1864